"Surfin'" is a song by American rapper Kid Cudi. It was released on September 30, 2016, as the lead single from his sixth studio album, Passion, Pain & Demon Slayin'. The lyrics were handled by Cudi, while the music was written and produced by Pharrell Williams, who also makes a vocal appearance on the extended outro of the album version of the song. The song was later included on Cudi’s first greatest hits album The Boy Who Flew to the Moon, Vol. 1 (2022).

Release and composition
The song was released alongside "Frequency", for digital download as dual singles on September 30, 2016. "Surfin'" runs for a duration of three minutes and 58 seconds. The album version of the song runs for a length of six minutes and 15 seconds. Vulture.com called Pharrell's production "sunny, upbeat electronic brass".<ref>{{cite web|url=http://www.vulture.com/2016/10/kid-cudi-drops-surfin-featuring-pharrell.html|title=Kid Cudi Couldn't Release His Album in Time, So Please Enjoy 'Surfin Featuring Pharrell Williams|publisher=}}</ref>  The song bears elements of African drums, with a styling of sea shanties. After five minutes of rapping between a chorus with A-A rhyme scheme, Cudi closes out the track and the album with 15 seconds of a capella yodeling.

Music video
The music video for the song, directed by Cudi himself, premiered on October 31, 2016, via his Vevo. The video features cameo appearances from King Chip, Jaden and Willow Smith, A$AP Nast and A$AP Rocky, and others.

In other media
In 2017, "Surfin'" was featured in a television advertisement issued by Adidas. The song was also featured in season three of HBO's series Ballers. It was also featured in the 2017 video games NBA Live Mobile and NBA Live 18 The One. The song was also featured in the TV series Inhumans. The instrumental was also used in the TV series How to Get Away with Murder''.

Charts

References

External links

2016 singles
Kid Cudi songs
Songs written by Kid Cudi
Songs written by Pharrell Williams
Song recordings produced by Pharrell Williams
Pharrell Williams songs
Republic Records singles